The 2004 Detroit Tigers season was the team's 104th season and its 5th at Comerica Park.  It involved the Detroit Tigers attempting to win the AL Central.  The team set a major league record with 11 players on the team hitting at least 10 home runs.  The Tigers' 104th season ended with the team finishing in fourth place at 72-90, 29 games better than their disastrous season of the previous year.  However, they were still 20 games behind the AL Central Champion Minnesota Twins.

The Tigers tied their own major league record for most home runs by a losing team when they hit seven homers in an 11–9 defeat to the Boston Red Sox on August 8.

Offseason
December 18, 2003: Al Levine was signed as a free agent with the Detroit Tigers.
December 19, 2003: Rondell White was signed as a free agent with the Detroit Tigers.
January 8, 2004 Acquired Carlos Guillén for Ramon Santiago and minor leaguer Juan Gonazalez.
January 14, 2004: Bobby Estalella was signed as a free agent with the Detroit Tigers.
 February 6, 2004: Iván Rodríguez signed as a free agent with the Detroit Tigers.
February 9, 2004: Bobby Estalella was released by the Detroit Tigers.
March 29, 2004: Ugueth Urbina was signed as a free agent with the Detroit Tigers.

Regular season

Standings

Record vs. opponents

Notable transactions
June 7, 2004: Justin Verlander was drafted by the Detroit Tigers in the 1st round (2nd pick) of the 2004 amateur draft. Player signed October 25, 2004.

Game log

|- bgcolor="bbffbb"
| 1 || April 5 || @ Blue Jays || 7–0 || || || || || 1–0 || W1
|- bgcolor="bbffbb"
| 2 || April 6 || @ Blue Jays || 7–3 || || || || || 2–0 || W2
|- bgcolor="bbffbb"
| 3 || April 7 || @ Blue Jays || 6–3 || || || || || 3–0 || W3
|- bgcolor="bbffbb"
| 4 || April 8 || Twins || 10–6 || || || || || 4–0 || W4
|- bgcolor="ffbbbb"
| 5 || April 10 || Twins || 5–10 || || || || || 4–1 || L1
|- bgcolor="bbffbb"
| 6 || April 11 || Twins || 6–5 || || || || || 5–1 || W1
|- bgcolor="ffbbbb"
| 7 || April 13 || Blue Jays || 5–7 || || || || || 5–2 || L1
|- bgcolor="bbffbb"
| 8 || April 14 || Blue Jays || 5–3 || || || || || 6–2 || W1
|- bgcolor="ffbbbb"
| 9 || April 15 || Blue Jays || 0–11 || || || || || 6–3 || L1
|- bgcolor="ffbbbb"
| 10 || April 16 || @ Indians || 3–10 || || || || || 6–4 || L2
|- bgcolor="bbffbb"
| 11 || April 17 || @ Indians || 6–1 || || || || || 7–4 || W1
|- bgcolor="ffbbbb"
| 12 || April 18 || @ Indians || 7–9 || || || || || 7–5 || L1
|- bgcolor="bbffbb"
| 13 || April 19 || @ Indians || 10–4 || || || || || 8–5 || W1
|- bgcolor="ffbbbb"
| 14 || April 20 || @ Twins || 4–6 || || || || || 8–6 || L1
|- bgcolor="bbffbb"
| 15 || April 21 || @ Twins || 11–8 || || || || || 9–6 || W1
|- bgcolor="ffbbbb"
| 16 || April 22 || @ Twins || 3–4 || || || || || 9–7 || L1
|- bgcolor="bbffbb"
| 17 || April 23 || Indians || 17–3 || || || || || 10–7 || W1
|- bgcolor="bbffbb"
| 18 || April 24 || Indians || 5–2 || || || || || 11–7 || W2
|- bgcolor="ffbbbb"
| 19 || April 25 || Indians || 2–3 || || || || || 11–8 || L1
|- bgcolor="ffbbbb"
| 20 || April 27 || Angels || 4–10 || || || || || 11–9 || L2
|- bgcolor="bbffbb"
| 21 || April 28 || Angels || 10–2 || || || || || 12–9 || W1
|- bgcolor="ffbbbb"
| 22 || April 29 || Angels || 3–12 || || || || || 12–10 || L1
|- bgcolor="ffbbbb"
| 23 || April 30 || Mariners || 1–3 || || || || || 12–11 || L2
|-

Roster

Player stats

Batting
Note: G = Games played; AB = At bats; H = Hits; Avg. = Batting average; HR = Home runs; RBI = Runs batted in

Pitching

Starting pitchers
Note: G = Games pitched; IP = Innings pitched; W = Wins; L = Losses; ERA = Earned run average; SO = Strikeouts

Other pitchers
Note: G = Games pitched; IP = Innings pitched; W = Wins; L = Losses; ERA = Earned run average; SO = Strikeouts

Relief pitchers
Note: G = Games pitched; W = Wins; L = Losses; SV = Saves; ERA = Earned run average; SO = Strikeouts

Farm system

LEAGUE CHAMPIONS: West Michigan

References

External links

2004 Detroit Tigers season at Baseball Reference

Detroit Tigers seasons
Detroit Tigers
Detroit
2004 in Detroit